Jane Bloomingdale (born March 10, 1956) is an American politician in the state of Iowa. She was elected to the Iowa House of Representatives in 2016. She previously served as Mayor of Northwood, Iowa.

References

Republican Party members of the Iowa House of Representatives
1956 births
Living people
21st-century American politicians